Criminal Lawyer is a 1951 American film noir crime film directed by Seymour Friedman and starring Pat O'Brien and Jane Wyatt.

Plot
A drunken attorney tries to sober up in order to defend a friend in murder case.

Cast
 Pat O'Brien as James Edward Reagan  
 Jane Wyatt as Maggie Powell  
 Carl Benton Reid as Tucker Bourne  
 Mary Castle as Gloria Lydendecker  
 Robert Shayne as Clark P. Sommers  
 Mike Mazurki as 'Moose' Hendricks  
 Jerome Cowan as Walter Medford  
 Marvin Kaplan as  Sam Kutler  
 Douglas Fowley as  Harry Cheney  
 Mickey Knox as Vincent Cheney  
 Louis Jean Heydt as  Frank Burnett

See also
 List of American films of 1951

References

Bibliography
 Blottner, Gene. Columbia Noir: A Complete Filmography, 1940-1962. McFarland, 2015.

External links
 
 
 
 

1951 films
1951 crime drama films
1950s English-language films
American crime drama films
Columbia Pictures films
Films directed by Seymour Friedman
American black-and-white films
1950s American films